The city of Montreal, Quebec, Canada, held a municipal election at the same time as numerous other municipalities in Quebec, on November 1, 2009. Voters elected the Mayor of Montreal, Montreal City Council, and the mayors and councils of each of the city's boroughs.

The election became plagued with allegations of corruption and mafia involvement in city contracts.

Results

Despite being assailed with accusations of corruption, incumbent Mayor Gérald Tremblay led his Union Montréal party to a third victory, although with reduced standings in city council. Union's seat totals remained firm especially in the boroughs merged into the city in 2002; it retained complete control of eight boroughs and near-complete control of three more.

Vision Montréal, led by former Quebec minister of municipal affairs Louise Harel, ran a campaign targeting the mayor on ethics. However, its campaign was blindsided by a scandal involving its second-in-command and former leader Benoit Labonté, who dropped out of the race. Vision increased its council standing but was unable to defeat the mayor. It won complete control of Mercier–Hochelaga-Maisonneuve and majorities in three other borough councils.

Third party Projet Montréal increased sharply in popularity. An Angus Reid poll  shortly prior to the election put its leader Richard Bergeron neck-and-neck (32%) with the two other main candidates (34% for Harel, 30% for Tremblay). He would finally come in third, but the party increased from just one seat at the previous election to ten council seats, two borough mayors, four borough councillors, and complete control of the borough of Le Plateau-Mont-Royal. Besides its main issue of public transit and urban planning, the party emphasized ethics, running its campaign on just $200,000.

Mayor of Montreal

Composition of city and borough councils

Depending on their borough, Montrealers voted for:

 Mayor of Montreal
 Borough mayor (except in Ville-Marie, whose mayor is the Mayor of Montreal), who is also a city councillor
 A city councillor for the whole borough or for each district, who is also a borough councillor (Outremont and L'Île-Bizard–Sainte-Geneviève have no city councillors other than the borough mayor)
 Zero, one, or two additional borough councillors for each district

Seat-by-seat results

Nomination was open until October 2 at 4:30 p.m.

Candidate statistics

Party names are the official ones registered with Élection Montréal.

Results by party

Ahuntsic-Cartierville

|-
| — 
| 84,532
| Borough mayor
| 38,11445.09%
|  |   
| Pierre Gagnier 12,760 (35.09%)
| 
| François Purcell 11,943 (32.84%)
| 
| Zaki Ghavitian 11,659 (32.06%)
|
|
|  |   
| Marie-Andrée Beaudoin
| PM gain from UM
|-
| Ahuntsic
| 21,037
| City councillor
| 10,53250.06%
|  |   
| Émilie Thuillier 3,484 (34.17%)
| 
| Diane Lemieux 3,364 (33.00%)
| 
| Frédéric Lapointe 3,347 (32.83%)
| 
|
|  |   
| Hasmig Belleli
| PM gain from VM
|-
| Bordeaux-Cartierville
| 21,345
| City councillor
| 8,43939.54%
| 
| Pericles Creticos 2,040 (25.31%)
|  |   
| Harout Chitilian 3,040 (37.71%)
| 
| Hasmig Belleli 2,578 (31.98%)
| 
| John Gentile (PMVM)403 (5.00%)
|  |   
| Noushig Eloyan
| UM gain from VM
|-
| Saint-Sulpice
| 21,605
| City councillor
| 9,07442.00%
| 
| Martin Bazinet 2,546 (29.25%)
|  |   
| Jocelyn Ann Campbell 3,099 (35.60%)
| 
| Jean-Jacques Lapointe 3,060 (35.15%)
|
|
|  |   
| Jocelyn Ann Campbell
| UM hold
|-
| Sault-au-Récollet
| 20,545
| City councillor
| 10,05548.94%
| 
| Jean-François Desgroseilliers3,030 (31.35%)
| 
| Léonardo Fiore2,384 (24.66%)
|  |   
| Étienne Brunet3,128 (32.36%)
| 
| Giovanna Giancaspro (Ind.)743 (7.69%)Achille Polcaro (PMVM)381 (3.94%)
|  |   
| Jean-François St-Onge
| VM gain from UM
|}

Anjou

|-
| rowspan=2 | — 
| rowspan=2 | 29,753
| Borough mayor
| 13,86746.61%
| 
| Philippe Duval 2,020 (15.10%)
|  |   
| Luis Miranda 7,403 (55.32%)
|
| Lynda Côté 3,958 (29.58%)
|
|
|  |   
| Luis Miranda
| UM hold 
|-
| City councillor
| 13,90246.72%
| 
| Yves Laporte 2,284 (17.19%)
|  |   
| Andrée Hénault 6,781 (51.03%)
| 
| Danielle Boulet 4,223 (31.78%)
|
|
|  |   
| Andrée Hénault
| UM hold 
|-
| Centre
| 11,083
| Borough councillor
| 5,32948.08%
|  
| Slimane Bah 857 (16.88%)
|  |   
| Michelle Zammit 2,722 (53.60%)
| 
| Badiona Bazin 1,499 (29.52%)
|
|
|  |   
| Michelle Zammit
| UM hold 
|-
| East
| 8,896
| Borough councillor
| 4,06245.66%
| 
| Julien Viel 656 (16.90%)
|  |   
| Paul-Yvon Perron 1,746 (44.99%)
|  
| Rémy Tondreau 1,479 (38.11%)
|
|
|  |   
| Rémy Tondreau
| UM gain from VM
|-
| West
| 9,774
| Borough councillor
| 4,48845,92%
| 
| Alexis Rochon 812 (18.92%)
|  |   
| Gilles Beaudry 2,342 (54.58%)
| 
| Souad Bounakhla 1,137 (26.50%)
|
|
|  |   
| Gilles Beaudry
| UM hold 
|}

Côte-des-Neiges–Notre-Dame-de-Grâce

|-
| — 
| 95,431
| Borough mayor
| 34,44136.09%
|  
| Carole Dupuis 8,678 (26.01%)
|  |   
| Michael Applebaum 17,409 (52.19%)
|  
| Brenda Mae Paris 5,686 (17.04%)
| 
| Jacqueline Sommereyns (PMVM) 1,586 (4.75%)
|  |   
| Michael Applebaum
| UM hold 
|-
| Côte-des-Neiges
| 16,773
| City councillor
| 6,43438.36%
|  
| Magda Popeanu2,111 (33.81%)
|  |   
| Helen FotopulosCo-candidate for Gérald Tremblay2,607 (41.75%)
| 
| Amelia Salehabadi1,382 (22.13%)
| 
| Ziyad Almbasher (PMVM)144 (2.31%)
|  |   
| Francine Sénécal
| UM hold 
|-
| Darlington
| 17,474
| City councillor
| 5,58431.96%
|  
| Kamala Jegatheeswaran1,137 (21.42%)
|  |   
| Lionel Perez2,322 (43.74%)
|  
| Keeton Clarke798 (15.03%)
| 
| Francine Brodeur (PMVM)435 (8.19%)Marlon Quintos (Ind.)312 (5.88%)Alex Robles (Ind.)305 (5.74%)
|  |   
| Saulie Zajdel
| UM hold 
|-
| Loyola
| 21,962
| City councillor
| 7,74035.24%
| 
| Cymry Jean Gomery1,476 (19.47%)
|  |   
| Susan Clarke2,525 (33.31%)
|  
| Hubert Gallet566 (7.47%)
| 
| Jeremy Searle (Ind.)2,270 (29.94%)George Pentsos (PMVM)744 (9.81%)
|  |   
| Warren Allmand
| UM hold 
|-
| Notre-Dame-de-Grâce
| 20,561
| City councillor
| 8,40040.85%
|  |   
| Peter McQueen3,441 (41.82%)
| 
| Marie-José Mastromonaco2,654 (32.26%)
| 
| David Hanna1,811 (22.01%)
|
| David Riachi (PMVM)177 (2.15%)Philippe Godley (Ind.)145 (1.76%)
|  |   
| Marcel Tremblay
| PM gain from UM
|-
| Snowdon
| 18,661
| City councillor
| 6,24033.44%
| 
| Daniel Grenon1,064 (17.79%)
|  |   
| Marvin Rotrand3,578 (59.82%)
| 
| Frédéric Tremblay939 (15.70%)
| 
| Carmen Dan (PMVM)400 (6.69%)
|  |   
| Marvin Rotrand
| UM hold 
|}

L'Île-Bizard–Sainte-Geneviève

|-
| — 
| 13,150
| Borough mayor
| 5,32740.51%
| 
| Luc Charlebois 925 (17.95%) 
|  |   
| Richard Bélanger 2,881 (55.91%)
|  
| René Gervais 1,168 (22.67%)
| 
| Nadia Vilmé (PMVM)179 (3.47%)Christian Prevost (Ind)Candidacy withdrawn
|  |   
| Richard Bélanger
| UM hold 
|-
| Denis-Benjamin-Viger
| 3,826
| Borough councillor
| 1,63542.73%
| 
| Gordon Craig170 (10.71%)
|  |   
| Christopher Little692 (43.58%)
| 
| Raymond Legault254 (15.99%)
| 
| Christian Larocque (Ind.)472 (29.72%)
|  |   
| Christopher Little
| UM hold 
|-
| Jacques-Bizard
| 3,044 
| Borough councillor
| 1,25541.23%
| 
| Jean-Dominic Lévesque-René 323 (27.23%)
|  |   
| François Robert538 (45.36%) 
| 
| Pascal Marchi325 (27.40%)
|
|
|  |   
| François Robert
| UM hold 
|-
| Pierre-Foretier
| 3,696
| Borough councillor
| 1,56642.37%
|  
| Daniel Dulude 309 (20.21%)
|  |   
| Diane Gibb 816 (53.37%)
|
| Denis Lessard 404 (26.42%)
|
|
|  |   
| Diane Gibb
| UM hold 
|-
| Sainte-Geneviève
| 2,584
| Borough councillor
| 87733.94%
| 
| Henri Malmström43 (5.05%)
| 
| Philippe Voisard344 (40.38%)
| 
| Éric Boissé65 (7.63%)
|  |   
| Jacques Cardinal (Ind.)400 (46.95%)
|  |   
| Philippe Voisard
| Ind. gain from UM
|}

Lachine

|-
| rowspan=2 | — 
| rowspan=2 | 30,441
| Borough mayor
| 12,04439.57%
|  
| Gilles Lortie 2,040 (17.45%)
|  |   
| Claude Dauphin 7,407 (63.37%)
| 
| Carolina Caruso 2,242 (19.18%)
| 
| 
|  |   
| Claude Dauphin
| UM hold 
|-
| City councillor
| 12 03339.53%
| 
| Daniel Racicot 2,589 (22.28%)
|  |   
| Jane Cowell-Poitras 6,839 (58.86%)
| 
| Zhao Xin Wu 2,191 (18.86%)
| 
| 
|  |   
| Jane Cowell-Poitras
| UM hold 
|-
| Du Canal
| 9,905
| Borough councillor
| 3,55835.92%
| 
| John Symon560 (16.38%)
|  |   
| Lise Poulin1,485 (43.45%)
| 
| Robert Monaco727 (21.27%)
| 
| Robert Farineau (Ind.)499 (14.60%)Mario Lavigne (Ind.)147 (4.30%)
|  |   
| Elizabeth Verge
| UM hold 
|-
| Fort-Rolland
| 10,360
| Borough councillor
| 4,93747.65%
| 
| Jody Anne Negley1,036 (21.67%)
|  |   
| Jean-François Cloutier2,765 (57.85%)
|  
| Claude de Lanauze979 (20.48%)
|
|
|  |   
| Jean-François Cloutier
| UM hold 
|-
| J.-Émery-Provost
| 10,176
| Borough councillor
| 3,53934.78%
| 
| Marc-André Rivest572 (16.74%)
|  |   
| Bernard Blanchet2,221 (65.00%)
|
| Raymond Dufort624 (18.26%)
| 
| 
|  |   
| Bernard Blanchet
| UM hold 
|}

LaSalle

|-
| — 
| 51,861
| Borough mayor
| 19,84838.27%
| 
| Olivier Lafontaine2,151 (11.31%)
|  |   
| Manon Barbe9,359 (49.19%)
|  
| Michael Vadacchino5,133 (26.98%)
| 
| Oksana Kaluzny (PVL)2,383 (12.52%)
|  |   
| Manon Barbe
| UM hold 
|-
| rowspan=3 | Cecil-P.-Newman
| rowspan=3 | 26,280
| City councillor
| 9,34135.54%
| 
| Dominique Matte1,154 (13.01%)
|  |   
| Alvaro Farinacci4,077 (45.97%)
| 
| Carlo Mannarino2,113 (23.83%)
| 
| Francisco Moreno (PVL)1,195 (13.48%)Saroj Kumar Dash (PMVM)329 (3.71%)
|  |   
| Alvaro Farinacci
| UM hold 
|-
| Borough councillor I
| 9,34035.54%
| 
| Livia James1,109 (12.65%)
|  |   
| Vincenzo Cesari4,145 (47.30%)
| 
| Enrico Pace2,150 (24.53%)
| 
| Giovanni Butterin (PVL)1,360 (15.52%)
|  |   
| Vincenzo Cesari
| UM hold 
|-
| Borough councillor II
| 9,33335.51%
| 
| Julien Demers977 (11.11%)
|  |   
| Josée Troilo3,692 (41.99%)
| 
| Jocelyne Bénard1,948 (22.16%)
| 
| Mario Orlando (PVL)1,471 (16.73%)Vas Karkavilas (PMVM)704 (8.01%)
|  |   
| Michael Vadacchino
| UM gain from VM
|-
| rowspan=3 | Sault-Saint-Louis
| rowspan=3 | 25,581
| City councillor
| 10,60741.46%
|
| Frédéric Demers1,318 (12.96%)
|  |   
| Richard Deschamps4,835 (47.55%)
| 
| Pierre Lussier2,489 (24.48%)
| 
| Éric Tremblay (PVL)1,113 (10.95%)Cécile Duhamel (PMVM)414 (4.07%)
|  |   
| Richard Deschamps
| UM hold 
|-
| Borough councillor I
| 10,63141.56%
| 
| Gregory Abel1,217 (11.97%)
|  |   
| Ross Blackhurst5,019 (49.38%)
| 
| Yves Desparois2,495 (24.55%)
|
| Mariya Pasternak (PVL)1,042 (10.25%)Gerald Wityshyn (PMVM)391 (3.85%)
|  |   
| Ross Blackhurst
| UM hold 
|-
| Borough councillor II
| 10,61541.50%
| 
| Benoît Couturier1,357 (13.45%)
|  |   
| Laura-Ann Palestini4,571 (45.30%)
|
| Gilbert Vachon2,770 (27.45%)
| 
| Devon Wyre (PVL)920 (9.12%)Lise Furlatt (PMVM)472 (4.68%)
|  |   
| Laura Palestini
| UM hold 
|}

Mercier–Hochelaga-Maisonneuve

|-
| — 
| 96,244
| Borough mayor
| 39,53141.07%
| 
| Ann Julie Fortier 9,640 (25.19%)
| 
| Claire St-Arnaud 8,528 (22.28%)
|  |   
| Réal Ménard 20,103 (52.53%)
| 
| 
|  |   
| Lyn Thériault
| VM hold 
|-
| Hochelaga
| 23,817
| City councillor
| 8,94937.57%
| 
| Éric Alan Caldwell2,560 (29.57%)
| 
| Louis Cléroux1,131 (13.07%)
|  |   
| Laurent Blanchard4,965 (57.36%)
| 
| 
|  |   
| Laurent Blanchard
| VM hold 
|-
| Louis-Riel
| 22,743
| City councillor
| 9,80443.11%
| 
| Michel Bouchard2,437 (25.73%)
| 
| Richer Dompierre2,926 (30.89%)
|  |   
| Lyn Thériault3,784 (39.95%)
| 
| Steve Lamer (Ind.)255 (2.69%)Kristian-Andrew Solarik (Ind.)69 (0.73%)
|  |   
| Richer Dompierre
| VM gain from UM
|-
| Maisonneuve–Longue-Pointe
| 24,752
| City councillor
| 10,07040.68%
| 
| Carl Bégin 2,569 (26.28%)
| 
| Christian Giguère 1,966 (20.11%)
|  |   
| Monique Comtois-BlanchetCo-candidate for Louise Harel 5,239 (53.60%)
| 
| 
|  |   
| Claire St-Arnaud
| VM gain from UM
|-
| Tétreaultville
| 24,932
| City councillor
| 10,74843.11%
|  
| Suzie Miron 3,196 (30.79%)
| 
| Serge Malaison 2,414 (23.26%)
|  |   
| Gaëtan Primeau 4,770 (45.95%)
| 
| 
|  |   
| Gaëtan Primeau
| VM hold 
|}

Montréal-Nord

|-
| — 
| 53,098
| Borough mayor
| 17,76233.45%
| 
| Ronald Boisrond 2,438 (14.55%)
|  |   
| Gilles Deguire 6,784 (40.50%) 	
| 
| Daniel Renaud 4,317 (25.77%)
| 
| Michelle Allaire (RMM)3,213 (19.18%)
|  |   
| Marcel Parent
| UM hold 
|-
| rowspan=2 | Marie-Clarac
| rowspan=2 | 27,807
| City councillor
| 9,52934.27%
| 
| Hugues Surprenant 1,456 (16.13%)
|  |   
| Clementina Teti-Tomassi3,410 (37.77%)
|  
| Marc L. Fortin2,817 (31.20%)
|  
| Louis Pelletier (RMM)1,345 (14.90%)
|  |   
| James Infantino
| UM hold 
|-
| Borough councillor
| 9,50634.19%
| 
| Saïd Ghoulimi 1,256 (13.96%)
|  |   
| Chantal Rossi 3,506 (38.96%)
| 
| Roland Carrier 2,824 (31.38%)
| 
| Jeannette Belisle (RMM)1,413 (15.70%)
|  |   
| Clementina Teti-Tomassi
| UM hold 
|-
| rowspan=2 | Ovide-Clermont
| rowspan=2 | 25,291
| City councillor
| 8,16232.27%
| 
| Judith Houedjissin920 (11.96%)
|  |   
| Jean-Marc Gibeau3,787 (49.21%)
| 
| Brunilda Reyes2,035 (26.45%)
|
| Réjean Loyer (RMM)953 (12.38%)
|  |   
| Jean-Marc Gibeau
| UM hold 
|-
| Borough councillor
| 8,17532.32%
| 
| Nicolas Bergeron 1,140 (14.89%)
|  |   
| Monica Ricourt 3,313 (43.28%)
| 
| Guerline Rigaud 2,020 (26.39%)
|  
| Lynn Boulerice (RMM)993 (12.97%)Henri-Paul Bernier (Ind.)189 (2.47%)
|  |   
| Normand Fortin
| UM hold 
|}

Outremont

|-
| — 
| 15,431
| Borough mayor
| 8,48054.95%
| 
| Étienne Coutu1,990 (24.04%)
|  |   
| Marie Cinq-Mars3,803 (45.95%)
| 
| Paul-André Tétreault2,484 (30.01%)
|
|
|  |   
| Marie Cinq-Mars
| UM hold 
|-
| Claude-Ryan
| 4,108
| Borough councillor
| 2,07050.39%
|  
| Mylène Freeman305 (15.02%)
|  |   
| Louis Moffatt912 (44.90%)
|  
| Duncan Robert Seebold362 (17.82%)
|  
| Jean de Julio-Paquin (PO)452 (22.26%)
|  |   
| Louis Moffatt
| UM hold 
|-
| Jeanne-Sauvé
| 3,654
| Borough councillor
| 2,06156.40%
| 
| Jérôme Bugel419 (20.97%)
|  |   
| Ana Nunes654 (32.73%)
| 
| Marc Vanier Vincent527 (26.38%)
|
| Pierre Simard (PO)398 (19.92%)
|  |   
| Ana Nunes
| UM hold 
|-
| Joseph-Beaubien
| 4,207
| Borough councillor
| 2,45258.28%
| 
| Denisa Baranceanu380 (15.75%)
| 
| Claude B. Piquette666 (27.60%)
| 
| Louise Gagné597 (24.74%)
|  |   
| Céline Forget (Ind.)770 (31.91%)
|  |   
| Claude B. Piquette
| Ind. gain from UM
|-
| Robert-Bourassa
| 3,462
| Borough councillor
| 1,89954.85%
| 
| Angèle Richer296 (15.90%)
|  |   
| Marie Potvin785 (42.16%)
| 
| Alain Tittley501 (26.91%)
| 
| Jean Girouard (PO)280 (15.04%)
|  |   
| Marie Potvin
| UM hold 
|}

Pierrefonds-Roxboro

|-
| — 
| 45,454
| Borough mayor
| 13,65430.04%
| 
| Michael Labelle4,483 (33.77%)
|  |   
| Monique Worth7,065 (53.22%)
| 
| Latif Zaki1,728 (13.02%)
|
|
|  |   
| Monique Worth
| UM hold 
|-
| rowspan=2 | East
| rowspan=2 | 24,127
| City councillor
| 7,46430.94%
| 
| Miguel Roman2,188 (30.35%)
|  |   
| Christian G. Dubois3,722 (51.63%)
| 
| Mustapha Kachani1,299 (18.02%)
|
|
|  |   
| Christian G. Dubois
| UM hold 
|-
| Borough councillor
| 7,47730.99%
| 
| Eva Salem Nakouzi1,913 (26.56%)
|  |   
| Dimitrios Jim Beis3,585 (49.77%)
|  
| Nathalie Morin1,705 (23.67%)
|
|
|  |   
| Roger Trottier
| UM hold 
|-
| rowspan=2 | West
| rowspan=2 | 21,327
| City councillor
| 6,19629.05%
|  
| Eric McCarty1,941 (32.23%)
|  |   
| Bertrand A. Ward3,264 (54.20%)
| 
| Olivier Manceau817 (13.57%)
|
|
|  |   
| Bertrand A. Ward
| UM hold 
|-
| Borough councillor
| 6,19729.06%
|
| Lisa Ann Cardi1,940 (32.29%)
|  |   
| Catherine Clément-Talbot3,260 (54.26%)
|  
| Alexandre Pagé-Chassé808 (13.45%)
|
|
|  |   
| Catherine Clément-Talbot
| UM hold 
|}

Le Plateau-Mont-Royal

|-
| — 
| 66,556
| Borough mayor
| 28,92043.45%
|  |   
| Luc Ferrandez12,541 (44.76%)
| 
| Michel Labrecque7,274 (25.96%)
| 
| Guillaume Vaillancourt7,620 (27.20%)
|
| Jean-François Larose (PMVM)582 (2.08%)
|  |   
| Helen Fotopulos
| PM gain from UM
|-
| rowspan=2 | DeLorimier
| rowspan=2 | 23,602
| City councillor
| 11,23847.61%
|  |   
| Josée Duplessis5,403 (49.51%)
|  
| Constance Ramacieri1,391 (12.75%)
| 
| Martine Hébert3,907 (35.80%)
|
| Antoine Bilodeau (PMVM)211 (1.93%)
|  |   
| Richard Bergeron
| PM hold 
|-
| Borough councillor
| 11,23747.61%
|  |   
| Carl Boileau 5,242 (48.12%)
| 
| Marc-Nicolas Kobrynsky 1,484 (13.62%)
| 
| Christine Fréchette 4,168 (38.26%)
|
|
|  |   
| Josée Duplessis
| PM hold 
|-
| rowspan=2 | Jeanne-Mance
| rowspan=2 | 21,235
| City councillor
| 8,40139.56%
|  |   
| Nimâ MachoufCo-candidate for Richard Bergeron3,271 (39.90%)
|
| Michel Prescott1,806 (22.03%)
| 
| Nathalie Rochefort2,404 (29.32%)
| 
| Marc-Boris St-Maurice (Ind.)548 (6.68%)Marc-André Bahl (PMVM)170 (2.07%)
|  |   
| Michel Prescott
| PM gain from UM
|-
| Borough councillor
| 8,40539,58%
|  |   
| Piper Huggins 3,457 (42.57%)
| 
| Isabel Dos Santos 2,719 (33.48%)
| 
| Jennifer-Lee Barker 1,945 (23.95%)
|
|
|  |   
| Isabel Dos Santos
| PM gain from UM
|-
| rowspan=2 | Mile End
| rowspan=2 | 21,719
| City councillor
| 9,25142.59%
|  |   
| Alex Norris4,262 (47.51%)
| 
| Robert Pilon1,885 (21.01%)
| 
| Pierre Marquis2,552 (28.45%)
| 
| Juliana Contreras (PMVM)272 (3.03%)
|  |   
| Michel Labrecque
| PM gain from UM
|-
| Borough councillor
| 9,253 (42.60%
|  |   
| Richard Ryan4,349 (48.52%)
|
| Eleni Fakotakis-Kolaitis2,059 (22.97%)
| 
| Michel Pauzé2,555 (28.51%)
|
|
|  |   
| Eleni Fakotakis-Kolaitis
| PM gain from UM
|}

Rivière-des-Prairies–Pointe-aux-Trembles

|-
| — 
| 77,592
| Borough mayor
| 30,96439.91%
| 
| Thérèse Deschambault5,845 (19.69%)
|  |   
| Joe Magri12,250 (41.27%)
| 
| Chantal Rouleau10,770 (36.28%)
|  
| Michel Daoust (Ind.)817 (2.75%)
|  |   
| Cosmo Maciocia
| UM hold
|-
| rowspan=2 | La Pointe-aux-Prairies
| rowspan=2 | 28,255
| City councillor
| 
| 
| Suzanne Morin 
| 
| Marco Veilleux 
|  |   
| Caroline Bourgeois 
|
|
|  |   
| Nicolas Montmorency
| VM gain from Ind.
|-
| Borough councillor
| 
| 
| Guillaume Raymond 
| 
| Joseph Di Pietro 
|  |   
| Mario Blanchet 
|
|
|  |   
| Joseph Di Pietro
| VM gain from UM
|-
| rowspan=2 | Pointe-aux-Trembles
| rowspan=2 | 24,747
| City councillor
| 
| 
| Marius Minier 
| 
| André Bélisle 
|  |   
| Suzanne Décarie 
| 
| Gérald Briand (Ind)
|  |   
| André Bélisle
| VM gain from UM
|-
| Borough councillor
| 
| 
| Carine Bernier 
|
| Stéphane Robitaille 
|  |   
| Gilles Déziel 
|
|
|  |   
| Suzanne Décarie
| VM hold 
|-
| rowspan=2 | Rivière-des-Prairies
| rowspan=2 | 24,590
| City councillor
| 
|
| Carole Leroux 
|  |   
| Maria Calderone 
| 
| Gennaro Bartoli 
|
|
|  |   
| Joe Magri
| UM hold
|-
| Borough councillor
| 
| 
| Sylvain Girard 
|  |   
| Giovanni Rapanà 
|  
| Francesco Ierfino 
|
|
|  |   
| Maria Calderone
| UM hold
|}

Rosemont–La Petite-Patrie

|-
| — 
| 96,802
| Borough mayor
| 43,90045.35%
| 
| Patrick Cigana13,902 (32.74%)
| 
| André Lavallée13,477 (31.74%)
|  |   
| François Croteau15,077 (35.51%)
|
|
|  |   
| André Lavallée
| VM gain from UM
|-
| Étienne-Desmarteau
| 23,834
| City councillor
| 11,32347.51%
|  |   
| Marc-André Gadoury4,295 (39.17%)
| 
| Carole Du Sault2,515 (22.94%)
|
| Rémy Trudel4,154 (37.89%)
|
|
|  |   
| Carole Du Sault
| PM gain from UM
|-
| Marie-Victorin
| 23,106
| City councillor
| 10,51145.49%
| 
| Michel Desmarais2,363 (23.41%)
|  
| Carle Bernier-Genest3,147 (31.18%)
|  |   
| Élaine Ayotte4,584 (45.41%)
|
|
|  |   
| Carle Bernier-Genest
| VM gain from UM
|-
| Saint-Édouard
| 24,500
| City councillor
| 10,67543.57%
|  |   
| François Limoges4,816 (46.52%)
| 
| Nicole McNeil2,045 (19.75%)
| 
| Atïm Leon3,206 (30.97%)
|
| Francine Faucher (PMVM)285 (2.75%)
|  |   
| François Purcell
| PM gain from UM
|-
| Vieux-Rosemont
| 25,362
| City councillor
| 11,40744.98%
| 
| Christine Gosselin3,736 (33.87%)
|  
| Gilles Grondin2,620 (23.75%)
|  |   
| Pierre Lampron4,674 (42.38%)
|
|
|  |   
| Gilles Grondin
| VM gain from UM
|}

Saint-Laurent

|-
| — 
| 56,747
| Borough mayor
| 18,76733.07%
| 
| Fouad Zerhouni2,486 (13.72%)
|  |   
| Alan DeSousa13,206 (72.89%)
| 
| Sergio Borja2,426 (13.39%)
|
|
|  |   
| Alan DeSousa
| UM hold
|-
| rowspan=2 | Côte-de-Liesse
| rowspan=2 | 29,030
| City councillor
| 9,29832.03%
| 
| Carole Laberge1,415 (15.71%)
|  |   
| Laval Demers5,793 (64.33%)
| 
| Sonia Fragapane1,230 (13.66%)
| 
| Bryce Durafourt (Ind.)567 (6.30%)
|  |   
| Laval Demers
| UM hold
|-
| Borough councillor
| 9,32832.13%
| 
| Frances Kotar1,493 (16.48%)
|  |   
| Maurice Cohen6,086 (67.20%)
| 
| Guillaume Benoit-Gagné1,478 (16.32%)
|
|
|  |   
| Maurice Cohen
| UM hold
|-
| rowspan=2 | Norman-McLaren
| rowspan=2 | 27,717
| City councillor
| 9,46934.16%
| 
| Mohammed Benzaria1,505 (16.70%)
|  |   
| Aref Salem5,166 (57.32%)
| 
| Joan Adams1,822 (20.22%)
|
| Alain Ackad (PMVM)520 (5.77%)
|  |   
| Patricia Bittar
| UM hold
|-
| Borough councillor
| 9,44134.06%
| 
| Léonard Langlois1,771 (19.73%)
|  |   
| Michèle D. Biron5,590 (62.28%)
| 
| Nezar Hammoud1,614 (17.98%)
|
|
|  |   
| Michèle Biron
| UM hold
|}

Saint-Léonard

|-
| — 
| 48,325
| Borough mayor
| 18,80338.91%
|    
| Nicolas Marchildon1,325 (7.42%)
|  |   
| Michel Bissonnet12,449 (69.72%)
|    
| Vittorio Capparelli2,035 (11.40%)
|    
| Italo Barone (ACM) 1,868 (10.46%)David Mallozzi (Ind) 179 (1.00%)
|  |   
| Michel Bissonnet
| UM hold
|-
| rowspan=2 | Saint-Léonard-Est
| rowspan=2 | 21,159
| City councillor
| 8,29439.20%
|    
| Franco Fiori947 (12.21%)
|  |   
| Robert L. Zambito4,928 (63.51%)
|    
| Raphaël Fortin1,135 (14.63%)
|    
| Louise Blackburn (ACM)749 (9.65%)
|  |   
| Yvette Bissonnet
| UM hold
|-
| Borough councillor
| 8,27039.09%
|    
| Martin Surprenant830 (10.84%)
|  |   
| Lili-Anne Tremblay4,429 (57.86%)
|    
| Marie-Lourdes Louis1,162 (15.18%)
|    
| Domenico Moschella (ACM)1,234 (16.12%)
|  |   
| Robert L. Zambito
| UM hold
|-
| rowspan=2 | Saint-Léonard-Ouest
| rowspan=2 | 27,166
| City councillor
| 10,48738.60%
|    
| Souad El Haous773 (7.90%)
|  |   
| Dominic Perri6,524 (66.69%)
|    
| Najat Boughaba1,330 (13.60%)
|    
| Rocco De Robertis (ACM)1,155 (11.81%)
|  |   
| Dominic Perri
| UM hold
|-
| Borough councillor
| 10,50038.65%
|    
| Martin Lavallée1,095 (11.09%)
|  |   
| Mario Battista6,653 (67.39%)
|    
| Carmelo De Stefano1,408 (14.26%)
|    
| Luis Ruivo (ACM)717 (7.26%)
|  |   
| Mario Battista
| UM hold
|}

Le Sud-Ouest

|-
| — 
| 49,148
| Borough mayor
| 17,85336.32%
| 
| Mudi Wa Mbuji Kabeya3,275 (19.24%)
| 
| Nicole Boudreau4,798 (28.19%)
|  |   
| Benoit Dorais4,826 (28.35%)
| 
| Line Hamel (Ind.)3,586 (21.07%)Camillien Delisle (Ind.)537 (3.15%)
|  |   
| Jacqueline Montpetit
| VM gain from UM
|-
| rowspan=2 | Saint-Henri–Petite-Bourgogne–Pointe-Saint-Charles
| rowspan=2 | 27,189
| City councillor
| 9,32334.29%
| 
| Steeve Lemay2,524 (28.27%)
|
| Pierre Fréchette2,538 (28.43%)
|  |   
| Véronique Fournier2,695 (30.19%)
| 
| Sylvain Patry (Ind.)792 (8.87%)Michel Fortin (Ind.)378 (4.23%)
|  |   
| Line Hamel
| VM gain from Ind.
|-
| Borough councillor
| 9,38534.52%
|  |   
| Sophie Thiébaut2,765 (30.92%)
|
| Danielle Godbout2,444 (27.33%)
| 
| Paul-Émile Rioux2,524 (28.23%)
|
| Émilie Bordat (Ind.)645 (7.21%)Sean Murphy (PMVM)564 (6.31%)
|  |   
| Pierre E. Fréchette
| PM gain from UM
|-
| rowspan=2 | Saint-Paul–Émard
| rowspan=2 | 21,959
| City councillor
| 8,54338.90%
|
| Marie-Pascale Deegan1,949 (24.27%)
|  |   
| Daniel Bélanger3,063 (38.14%)
| 
| Benjamin Cartier3,018 (37.58%)
|
|
|  |   
| Jean-Yves Cartier
| UM gain from VM
|-
| Borough councillor
| 8,55838.97%
| 
| Hélène Leblanc1,744 (21.52%)
| 
| Diane Robitaille Pignoloni2,494 (30.78%)
|  |   
| Huguette Roy2,574 (31.77%)
| 
| Ronald Bossy (Ind.)1,291 (15.93%)
|  |   
| Ronald Bossy
| VM gain from Ind.
|}

Verdun

|-
| — 
| 47,141
| Borough mayor
| 18,07338.34%
|
| Yannick Brosseau 3,892 (22.22%)
|  |   
| Claude Trudel 6,993 (39.92%)
| 
| Richard Langlais 5,578 (31.84%)
| 
| Pierre Labrosse (PMVM) 1,055 (6.02%)
|  |   
| Claude Trudel
| UM hold
|-
| rowspan=3 | Champlain–L'Île-des-Sœurs
| rowspan=3 | 24,618
| City councillor
| 9,72139.49%
|  
| Alain Fredet2,160 (22.99%)
|  |   
| Ginette Marotte3,430 (36.51%)
| 
| Catherine Chauvin3,289 (35.01%)
|  
| Denise Larouche (PMVM)516 (5.49%)
|  |   
| Ginette Marotte
| UM hold
|-
| Borough councillor I
| 9,72139.49%
| 
| Mathieu Lutfy2,250 (24.11%)
|  |   
| Paul Beaupré3,455 (37.02%)
| 
| André Julien3,070 (32.89%)
|  
| Rickie Richard (PMVM)559 (5.99%)
|  |   
| Paul Beaupré
| UM hold
|-
| Borough councillor II
| 9,71639.47%
| 
| Ken McLaughlin2,180 (23.28%)
|  |   
| Andrée Champoux3,308 (35.32%)
| 
| Pierre L'Heureux3,270 (34.92%)
| 
| Pierre Rousseau (PMVM)607 (6.48%)
|  |   
| Marc Touchette
| UM hold
|-
| rowspan=3 | Desmarchais-Crawford
| rowspan=3 | 22,523
| City councillor
| 8,33437.00%
| 
| Mathieu Boisvert1,901 (23.61%)
|  |   
| Alain Tassé3,115 (38.69%)
| 
| Antoine Richard2,429 (30.17%)
| 
| Jeannette Lafrance (PMVM)606 (7.53%)
|  |   
| Alain Tassé
| UM hold
|-
| Borough councillor I
| 8,35137.08%
| 
| Xavier Mondor 1,837 (22.84%)
|  |   
| Ann Guy 2,922 (36.33%)
| 
| Jean-François Parenteau 2,784 (34.61%)
| 
| Diane Schinck (PMVM)501 (6.23%)
|  |   
| Josée Lavigueur Thériault
| UM hold
|-
| Borough councillor II
| 8,35037.07%
| 
| Beatriz Guarin1,752 (21.72%)
|  |   
| André Savard3,234 (40.09%)
| 
| Michelle Tremblay2,691 (33.36%)
| 
| Robert Couturier (PMVM)390 (4.83%)
|  |   
| André Savard
| UM hold
|}

Ville-Marie

|-
| — 
| n/a 
| Borough mayor
| colspan=9 align=center | Elected position abolished (Mayor of Montreal serves as borough mayor)
|  |   
| Benoit Labonté
| VM loss to redistricting
|-
| rowspan=2 | Peter-McGill
| 18,201
| City councillor
| 5,17928.45%
|    
| David-Roger Gagnon 701 (13.77%)
|  |   
| Sammy Forcillo 1,951 (38.33%)
|    
| Denise Dussault 618 (12.14%)
|    
| 
|  |   
| Catherine Sévigny
| UM hold
|-
| n/a
| Borough councillor
| colspan=9 align=center | Position abolished
|  |   
| Karim Boulos
| Ind. loss to redistricting
|-
| Saint-Jacques
| 20,750
| City councillor
| 7,80637.62%
| 
| Siou Fan Houang2,237 (29.48%)
|  
| Catherine Sévigny1,965 (25.90%)
|  |   
| François Robillard3,127 (41.21%)
| 
| Gérald Yane (PMVM)259 (3.41%)
| colspan=2 | Position created
| VM gain
|-
| Sainte-Marie
| 15,761
| City councillor
| 6,24539.62%
|  |   
| Pierre Mainville3,689 (64.94%)
|
| Yves Pelletier1,144 (20.14%)
| 
| Benoit LabontéCandidacy withdrawn
| 
| 
| colspan=2 | Position created
| PM gain
|-
| rowspan=2 | Sainte-Marie–Saint-Jacques
| n/a
| City councillor
| colspan=9 align=center | Position abolished
|  |   
| Sammy Forcillo
| UM loss to redistricting
|-
| n/a
| Borough councillor
| colspan=9 align=center | Position abolished
|  |   
| Pierre Mainville
| PM loss to redistricting
|}

Villeray–Saint-Michel–Parc-Extension

|-
| — 
| 87,788
| Borough mayor
| 33,92638.65%
| 
| Nicolas Thibodeau7,452 (23.06%)
|  
| Marcel Tremblay10,709 (33.14%)
|  |   
| Anie Samson12,800 (39.61%)
|    
| Beverly Bernardo (Ind.)705 (2.18%)Jacques Brisebois (Ind.)653 (2.02%)
|  |   
| Anie Samson
| VM hold
|-
| François-Perrault
| 22,228
| City councillor
| 8,33237.48%
| 
| Marie-Josée Beauchamp2,219 (27.97%)
|  |   
| Frank Venneri2,877 (36.26%)
| 
| Harry Delva2,556 (32.22%)
| 
| Guillaume Blouin-Beaudoin (Ind.)282 (3.55%)
|  |   
| Frank Venneri
| UM hold
|-
| Parc-Extension
| 19,913
| City councillor
| 7,16635.99%
| 
| Bernarda Klatt899 (13.11%)
|  |   
| Mary Deros3,476 (50.69%)
| 
| Costa Zafiropoulos1,608 (23.45%)
| 
| George Lemontzoglou (EPM)534 (7.79%)Moshfiqur Rahman Khan (Ind.)215 (3.14%)Sorin Vasile Iftode (PMVM)126 (1.84%)
|  |   
| Mary Deros
| UM hold
|-
| Saint-Michel
| 21,770
| City councillor
| 7,11132.66%
| 
| Jack Thierry Morency891 (13.35%)
|  |   
| Frantz Benjamin2,898 (43.41%)
| 
| Soraya Martinez2,478 (37.12%)
| 
| Valentino Nelson (PMVM)409 (6.13%)
|  |   
| Soraya Martinez
| UM gain from VM
|-
| Villeray
| 23,877
| City councillor
| 11,30147,33%
|  
| Éric Daoust2,936 (26.69%)
| 
| Sylvain Lachance1,895 (17.23%)
|  |   
| Elsie Lefebvre5,972 (54.29%)
| 
| Luis Corcuera (EPM)198 (1.80%)
|  |   
| Sylvain Lachance
| VM gain from UM
|}

Declined
Johanna Raso - Financial consultant, former lecturer at McGill University, published articles.  She was invited to run for borough mayor by both major parties, Union Montreal and Vision Montreal.  She declined both invitations, despite campaign support from the business community.

References

External links
Élection Montréal 2009
Official election results

Montreal Municipal Election
2009
2000s in Montreal
2009 in Quebec